Zeki Sayar (1905–2000) was a Turkish architect, journalist and the publisher of Turkey's first architectural magazine, Arkikekt.. His purpose was to introduce Turkish architects to the public to improve their prospects.

Arkitekt 

The first architectural magazine of Turkey was called Arkitekt. Sayar introduced it with Abidin Mortaş and A.Ziya Kozanoğlu in 1935.At first, the magazine was called Mimar (architect in Turkish). They were forced to change its name by the Press Public Directorate, after a linguistic revolution in Turkey. They picked their name on that of the Finnish magazine Arkkitehti, given that Finnish and Turkish are part of the same language group. Both Mortaş and Kozanoğlu left and Zeki Sayar continued to publish Arkitekt for 50 years. Sayar translated and published  writings of Famous architects like Le Corbusier

Other positions 

 Lecturer by proxy in Government Arts Academy Devlet sanatlar Akademisi in 1939  
  Architecture Consultant of Turkish Republic Central Bank İstanbul Section (T.C. Merkez Bankası İstanbul Şubesi) and Textile Exchange Factories (Mensucat Santral Fabrikaları) 1942–1950
  Council member of Istanbul Public Council 1944-1950
  Chairman of Turkish Master of Arts Architects Federation 1945–1948
  Co-founder of Chamber of Architects in 1954

Awards 
 Honorary PhD degree from Istanbul Government Fine Arts Academy for his efforts to promote Turkish architecture in both locally and internationally in 1972
 Chamber of Architects gave him an Honour plaque (“onur plaketi”) in 1981
 Chamber of Architects gave him profession assistance accomplishment reward (“mesleğe katkı başarı ödülü”) in 1988

Interior Colonization (Kolonisation Interieure) 

Zeki Sayar promoted interior colonization in Arkitekt. Interior colonization is used since 1929 in European countries to return a migrated population to small cities instead of big cities. He was against one plan type and wrote that architects should consider villagers' way of life and tradition. He believed there should be standardized ovens, bathrooms and kitchens to familiarize villagers with modern ways and one type of local building materials for later repairs.

References

1905 births
2000 deaths
20th-century Turkish architects
Turkish journalists
20th-century journalists